Webster Baptist Church is a historic Baptist church located at Webster in Monroe County, New York.  It is a large Greek Revival style cobblestone church building built in 1856. The building features an octagonal open domed belfry supported by eight Ionic columns. It has a veneer of small, rounded and uniform lake-washed cobbles. It is one of only 14 cobblestone church buildings in New York state, and of 106 cobblestone structures in Monroe County.  The building was fully renovated in 1965.

It was listed on the National Register of Historic Places in 1991.

References

External links
home - Webster Baptist Church

Churches on the National Register of Historic Places in New York (state)
Baptist churches in New York (state)
Cobblestone architecture
Churches completed in 1856
19th-century Baptist churches in the United States
Churches in Monroe County, New York
National Register of Historic Places in Monroe County, New York